is a former Nippon Professional Baseball catcher.

External links

1974 births
Living people
Japanese baseball coaches
Japanese baseball players
Nippon Professional Baseball catchers
Nippon Professional Baseball coaches
Baseball people from Nagasaki Prefecture
People from Sasebo
Yomiuri Giants players